Karakum may refer to:
Karakum Desert, a desert in Central Asia
Karakum (film), a 1994 Turkmen film
Karakum Canal, Turkmenistan 
Karakum District, Turkmenistan

See also
 Karakoram, a large mountain range spanning the borders of India, Pakistan and China
 Karakorum, a medieval city in Mongolia